Rupganj Tigers Cricket Club are a team that plays List A cricket in the Dhaka Premier Division Cricket League. They are named after Rupganj in eastern Dhaka.

Rupganj Tigers were promoted to List A status for the first time for the 2021–22 tournament, along with City Club. They played their first match against Abahani Limited on 15 March 2022, winning by seven wickets.

List A record
 2021-22: 15 matches, won 6, finished fifth

Records
The highest List A score for Rupganj Tigers is 124 by Zakir Hasan in 2021-22, and the best bowling figures are 5 for 41 by Enamul Haque in 2021-22.

References

External links
 Rupganj Tigers Cricket Club at CricketArchive

Dhaka Premier Division Cricket League teams